David Preece may refer to:
 David Preece (footballer, born 1963) (1963–2007), played for Walsall, Luton Town, Derby County and Cambridge United
 David Preece (footballer, born 1976), played for Darlington, Aberdeen and Silkeborg IF
 David Preece (racing driver), former British racing driver